Žiar may refer to:

Žiar, Liptovský Mikuláš District, a municipality in Slovakia
Žiar, Revúca District, a municipality in Slovakia
Žiar (mountain range), Slovakia
Short name of Žiar nad Hronom